Mars 1M No.1,  designated Mars 1960A by NASA analysts and dubbed Marsnik 1 by the Western media, was the first spacecraft launched as part of the Soviet Union's Mars programme. A Mars 1M spacecraft, it was intended for conducting flight testing system and to study the interplanetary environment between Earth and Mars, however it was lost in a launch failure before it could begin its mission.

Launch  
Mars 1M No.1 was the payload of the Molniya 8K78 rocket's maiden flight. The rocket, which had serial number L1-4M, was a new derivative of the R-7 series, with a Blok-I third stage replacing the Blok-E used on the Vostok, and a new Blok-L fourth stage. The vehicle lifted off from Site 1/5 at the Baikonur Cosmodrome at 14:27:49 UTC on 10 October 1960.

Scientific Instruments 

 Ultraviolet Spectrometer
 Radiation Detector
 Cosmic-Ray Detector
 Television Imaging System (Removed)
 Spectroreflectometer (Removed)

Television Imaging System and Spectroreflectometer were removed due to mass constraints.

End of mission 
It was determined that during the course of the second stage of flight, resonant vibration in the third stage of the rocket caused the malfunction of a gyroscope and it damaged the attitude control system of the carrier rocket. Following this issue, the horizon sensor disconnected from the booster and the rocket descended from its normal flight path angle. As a consequence the rocket's third stage was commanded to stop ignition after five minutes of flight. During this stage the spacecraft flew to an altitude of  before re-entry. Thereafter, the spacecraft re-entered and disintegrated in LEO and its debris fell over Siberia  down range. It failed to achieve low earth orbit.

See also

 List of missions to Mars

References

1960 in the Soviet Union
Spacecraft launched in 1960
Satellite launch failures
Mars program
Space accidents and incidents in the Soviet Union